Rustica pseudouncus is a moth of the family Erebidae first described by Michael Fibiger in 2008. It is known from southern Sri Lanka.

Adults have been found from February to July, suggesting multiple generations per year.

The wingspan is 12–15 mm. The forewing is long; narrow and the reniform stigma is weakly marked (like in Tortricidae species), the costal patch at the upper medial area is well marked and blackish. The subterminal line is marked, dark brown and waved. The terminal line on the hindwing is weakly defined.

References

Micronoctuini
Moths described in 2008
Taxa named by Michael Fibiger